Lt. General Ziaur Rahman Bir Uttom's tenure as President of Bangladesh started with his acquisition of the presidency from Abu Sadat Mohammad Sayem on April 21, 1977, after the latter resigned from his position on health grounds.

Zia became the President of Bangladesh at a time when Bangladesh was suffering from a host of challenges that included low productivity, food shortage that resulted in a famine in 1974, unsatisfactory economic growth, massive corruption and a polarized and turbulent political atmosphere after the assassination of Sheikh Mujibur Rahman and his family members in a coup that was followed by a series of counter-coups in the military.

Ziaur Rahman is credited as a solid administrator with pragmatic policies who contributed to the economic recovery of Bangladesh by liberalizing trade and promoting private sector investments. During his presidency, Bangladesh started manpower export to different middle-eastern countries which eventually become Bangladesh's major source of foreign remittance and transformed the rural economy of the country. Besides, it was during his time that Bangladesh started exporting ready-made garments to take the benefits of the multi-fibre agreement, a sector that makes up 84% of the total export in Bangladesh. The share of customs duty and sales tax in total tax of Bangladesh grew from 39% of 1974 to 64% in 1979 which reflects a massive surge in economic activities inside the country.

During his presidency, Bangladesh's agricultural output grew two to three folds within five years. Jute became profitable for the first time in independent Bangladesh's history in 1979.

Zia's tenure as president saw a series of deadly coups in the Bangladesh Army that threatened his life. He suppressed the coups with brute force and after each coup secret trials were held inside the cantonment according to the military law. But he ran out of luck on May 30, 1981, when some military men forced their way inside the Chittagong Circuit House and killed him there.

He received a state funeral in Dhaka on June 2, 1981, which was attended by hundreds and thousands of people, making it one of the largest funerals in the history of the world.

South Asia specialist William B. Milam said, ‘It is hard to imagine what would have happened to Bangladesh had Ziaur Rahman been assassinated in 1975 instead of 1981. A failed state on the model of Afghanistan or Liberia might well have resulted. Zia saved Bangladesh from that fate.’

Accession to Presidency

Bangladesh after independence
After the independence of Bangladesh, chaos and power struggles between different groups ensued. Political murders became a common thing and productivity of key industries did not return to the pre-independence level. Despite the funnelling of million dollar-worth aid, Bangladesh was in acute shortage of foreign currency and political patronage made it difficult to distribute the aid to the poorest quintile of the citizens. In 1974 after a devastating flood, despite the availability of food grains, a famine began that killed around a million. Sheikh Mujibur Rahman, the then Prime Minister of Bangladesh, in a desperate bid to save the situation amended the constitution and 'institutionalized autocracy' by making him effectively the ‘unimpeachable’ President and curtailed the freedom of the judiciary and press.

Eight months after the constitutional amendment, he was killed along with his family members in a pre-dawn coup on August 15, 1975, that threw the country into deeper turmoil. A section of his colleagues from the Awami League, backed by his killers, took charge of the state under the leadership of Khandakar Moshtaque Ahmed, his longtime friend.

On November 3 a counter-coup led by the Chief of General Staff of the Bangladesh Army, Brigadier General Khaled Mosharraf put the Chief of Army Major General Ziaur Rahman under house arrest, made himself the chief of the army, and replaced the President Khandakar Moshtaque with his nominee Abu Sadat Mohammad Sayem. But before he can consolidate his grip over the situation, a counter-coup was staged by the followers of Zia within the army, orchestrated by retired Colonel Abu Taher on November 7, that freed Zia and brought him to the centre of power.

Military administration and presidential crisis
After the counter-coup of November 7, a military administration was formed with President Abu Sadat Mohammad Sayem as the chief martial law administrator. Ziaur Rahman, the chief of the Army, became a deputy chief martial law administrator along with the two other chiefs of the Navy and Air force. However, Bangladesh's constitution did not have any provision for these arrangements.

President Sayem formed a board of advisors to run the country where Zia was bestowed with the portfolio of Finance, Home affairs, Information and Broadcasting. The new president declared a date for the national election. However, most of the political parties were against the election as they were largely unprepared compared to their rival Awami League. This made the situation difficult for the president.

In early 1977, the president was diagnosed with a problem in his gallbladder and his doctor advised him to go for long rest, compelling him to think of retiring from his position. On April 20 of the year, his advisors led by Abdus Sattar came to see him and advised him to resign in favour of Ziaur Rahman. President Sayem summoned Ziaur Rahman and asked about his thoughts regarding this proposed arrangement to which Zia agreed wholeheartedly.

On April 21, president Sayem resigned and Ziaur Rahman took the charge of Bangladesh's president.

Referendum and elections

1977 Confidence Referendum

Less than 24 hours of his taking over the charge as the president of Bangladesh, Zia declared to hold a confidence referendum to know the view of the people about his regime. Critics suggest that the confidence referendum was his bid to legitimize his presidency.

The referendum, which was held on May 30, 1977, stunned the political commentators and observers. Voters were asked, "Do you have confidence in President Major General Ziaur Rahman BU and the policies and programs adopted by him?". Zia got 98.87% of the votes according to the Election Commission of Bangladesh, with only 1% of voters opposing his views, raising serious questions about the process.

As controversy engulfed the referendum, Zia declared a hold a popular vote in the next year.

1978 Presidential Election
After the independence, Bangladesh opted for parliamentary democracy where people elected a representative for their constituency and these representatives known as members of parliament, elected the president of the state which was a titular position compared to the Prime Minister. But after the fourth amendment of the constitution, Bangladesh effectively became a democracy with a Presidential system of government.

This presidential election was the first presidential election to be held in Bangladesh after the transformation. Zia, a war-hero, joined the race as the candidate of the Jatiyabadi Front, an alliance of six parties that included pro-Islam parties like the Muslim League on the one hand and minority-led parties like the Scheduled Caste Federation, on the other hand. His prime challenger was the commander-in-chief of the Bangladesh liberation forces in 1971, General M.A.G. Osmani, backed by the Gonotantrik Oikyo Jote, a platform of the Awami League and some leftist parties.

Zia bagged around 76% of the votes while General Osmani managed to convince 21% of the voters according to the tallies shared by the authority. Supporters of Osmani claimed that the election was rigged and incidents of stuffing ballot boxes took place across the country. However, an analysis of the results shows that the election was largely fair and in some of the Awami League dominated districts like Gopalganj, Ziaur Rahman received as low as 16% of the total votes. Zia bagged a huge amount of votes in the areas where the Muslim League fared well in the 1946 Indian provincial elections.

Winning the election gave Zia some sort of legitimacy to run Bangladesh as the President.

Key reforms
Ziaur Rahman is credited for leading some of the key reforms that eventually shaped the economy and societies of Bangladesh. These reforms include the liberalization of trade, economic activities, promoting entrepreneurship resulting in export-led growth.

Liberalization of economy
Ziaur Rahman presided over the transformation of Bangladesh from a socialist closed economy to a capitalist liberal economy, from 1977 to 1981. Zia was generally considered "pro-market" and "laissez-faire".

Privatization

When he came to power, 92% of the industrial sector was under public ownership due to the policy of nationalization imposed by the Sheikh Mujibur Rahman government. The Mujib government nationalized 18 heavy industries including steel, petrochemical, mining and power. Ziaur Rahman-led government denationalize at least 10 sectors and introduced provisions to hand over the ownership of certain industries to local entrepreneurs and support them with funds. Apart from that, the Bengali industrialists who lost their industries to the government due to the nationalization policy were compensated.

The first sector to be privatized was the tanneries as most of them were under lock and key after the wholesale nationalization of industries. One of the first few tanneries to be privatized was the Orient Tanneries which was bought by Syed Manzur Elahi, a young businessman, who transformed it into the Apex tanneries and started exporting processed leather soon. Contribution of leather industry in Bangladesh's export earning grew from 4.6% to 10.1% between 1973 and 1983 after the tanneries were privatized.

Promoting investment and trade

In 1972, the ceiling for private investment was initially only 2.5 million BDT restricting private investments. As a part of the liberalization efforts led by President Zia, the ceiling on private investment was abolished in 1978.

Dhaka Stock Exchange, which was shut down after the independence, was reopened to bring in the idle money and savings to the mainstream investment scenario. The first international bank, the Bank of Credit and Commerce International (now Eastern Bank Limited), was granted to open a branch in Dhaka. The development policies were designed to support entrepreneurs. Investment Corporation Bangladesh was established to promote investments and bridge financing.

The government of Bangladesh imposed 100% export duty on wet leather in 1977 so that tanneries feel encouraged to produce crust and finished leather goods. Awards for best exporters were introduced to encourage businessmen and entrepreneurs.

Industrialization

Ziaur Rahman's presidency was marked by the beginning of the ready-made garments industry that eventually transformed Bangladesh's economy. His government drafted some crucial policies to promote industrialization in Bangladesh.

Establishment of the RMG sector

Ziaur Rahman's presidency was marked by the beginning of the ready-made garments industry that eventually transformed Bangladesh's economy. The first export-oriented RMG factory to be established in Bangladesh was Desh Garments by Nurul Quader Khan. It was made possible by the partnership with the famous Daewoo Corporation of South Korea which was looking for an alternative country other than the east Asian countries to set up a factory.

When they approached the Bangladesh government with the proposal, it was Ziaur Rahman who decided to support the initiative and linked the officials of Daewoo with Nurul Quader Khan and his team. Daewoo not only invested in Desh Garments but also trained their staff who would later start their own ready-made garments factories. Zia's support assured the South Koreans that unexpected institutional problems would be dealt with accordingly which inspired them to invest in Bangladesh.

Besides, to support local RMG factories, the Zia government introduced back to back letter of credit facility and provisions for bonded warehouse. Income tax on export earnings was withdrawn to support the growth of the industry.

Loan and duty support

Seven years of tax holiday was declared for new industries and concessions on electric bill at a preferential rate was declared. In addition to that, the 15-year moratorium on the nationalization of key industries imposed by the previous government was withdrawn. Bangladesh Shilpa Bank and Bangladesh Shilpa Rin Sangstha (Bangladesh Development Bank Limited) were instructed to provide credit support for new investments.

Export processing zone

Ziaur Rahman's government, realizing the need for a special zone to fast-track the industrialization and trade activities, formulated plans to set up export processing zones in Bangladesh. With a view to establishing the EPZs, the Bangladesh Export Processing Zone Authority was established in 1980. The body started its work to establish the first EPZ in Chattagram, which was completed by 1983.

Multi-party Democracy
Ziaur Rahman introduced multi-party democracy, one of the founding principles of Bangladesh, that allowed all the parties to operate freely and participate in the elections. Though this paved way for some religion-based parties to reorganize themselves, it also provided minority political organizations like the Scheduled Caste Federation to join politics. He believed in countering political philosophies with a better philosophy, instead of banning them.

Agricultural reforms
After the liberation war, due to unfavourable weather and some policy barriers, harvesting stayed lower than that of the pre-independence level compelling the country to reach the international donors for large sums of food aid each year. But in 1974, when the famine began, food did not remain a humanitarian problem, it became a political problem. As a result, the Zia-led new government revised some of the previous policies and introduced some reforms to solve the food problem once and for all. President Zia's focus was on increasing cereal production rapidly so that the country become self-sufficient and less dependent on aid. Scholars agreed that the production grew much faster than population during the post-1975/76 period.

Canal digging and irrigation

To counter the problem of drought and floods, Ziaur Rahman stressed the importance of digging irrigation canals in every village in the country. The idea was that the canals will store rainwater during the rainy season and prevent flooding and the same water will be used to irrigate the cultivable lands. To motivate villagers to dig their own canal, a food-for-work program was launched in different areas. Villagers, supervised by the government, dug their own canals that helped them to irrigate their lands. Within years, 2200 miles of new canals were dug across the country.

Besides, the government provided subsidies to the farmers to set up deep tube wells.

Market-driven fertilizer distribution

After the independence, Bangladesh Agricultural Development Corporation appointed dealers to distribute fertilizers at a subsidized rate to the farmers. But these appointed dealers utilized their monopoly to sell the fertilizers at a higher rate to the farmers misappropriating the subsidy. In 1978, the new government addressed this issue by removing the process of appointing dealers for fertilizer distribution and relying entirely on the private sector to distribute key fertilizers at a government-administered price. Between 1979 and 1983, BADC's role was restricted to procurement and wholesale distribution of fertilizer to the local businessmen instead of the few chosen ones.

Health sector
Bangladesh, with a land size of some 56,000 square miles, was facing serious health problems that included increasing birth rate, malnutrition, smallpox, chronic diarrhoea and other water-borne diseases, immediately after the independence. However, the government did not seem to be serious about solving the problems. President Zia made some quick efforts to address the problems, particularly in promoting vaccination and birth control that effectively cut the population growth.

Population control

In 1974 the population of Bangladesh had a population of around 71,300,000 people, with around 500 people per square kilometre, and the projections of the population by 2003 ranged between 153,400,000 and 187,800,000 putting Bangladesh at the risk of a potential food security crisis.

The Zia-led government launched an extensive birth-control campaign personally supervised by President Ziaur Rahman. Around 12,000 family planning officials were appointed by the government to popularise the birth control programs during his presidency. Bangladesh utilized a 'Cafetoria Approach' where at one place all sorts of contraceptive were distributed for free. Also sterlization was promoted with small cash incentives.

Establishing ICDDR,B

One of Bangladesh's ever persisting problems has been the Cholera that caused multiple epidemics in the region. In the 1960s with the support of the U.S. government a cholera research laboratory was established in Bangladesh (then East Pakistan). But after the independence due to the tensions between the U.S. and Bangladesh governments, the laboratory struggled to receive the required funds and downsized its activities.

But after the change in government in late 1975, the relationship between Bangladesh and the U.S. was normalized and western researchers on cholera proposed the formation of an international standard research centre with medical facilities to prevent future Cholera epidemics. The Zia government considered the proposal with utmost priority and passed an act in the parliament to establish the International Centre for Diarrhoeal Disease Research, Bangladesh. The centre was inaugurated by President Zia himself on June 26, 1979, and a trustee board was formed with renowned scientists and experts to run the centre. Eleven of fourteen members of the founding trustee board were foreign experts and scientists.

Mass Immunization

The journey of mass immunization began during the presidency of Ziaur Rahman under the Expanded Programme on Immunization (EPI), which was a global initiative of WHO to provide life-saving vaccines to all children of the world, launched in 1974. Due to the political instability in the early 1970s and lack of infrastructure Bangladesh was unable to initiate the mass immunization campaign in the first few years. On 7 April 1979, the Expanded Programme of Immunization began in Bangladesh as a pilot projection in eight areas. The programme was designed to provide six conventional vaccines- BCG, DPT, OPV, TT and Measles to all the children of Bangladesh within a few years.

This vaccination programme was later expanded to all the areas of Bangladesh in the next two decades cutting the child mortality rate significantly.

Local development programmes

Rural electrification

Electrifying the villages was one of the core policy measures taken by Ziaur Rahman. This is manifested by the establishment of the Rural Electrification Board in 1977 by a presidential ordinance with immediate effect. By January 1978, the REB, a  semi-autonomous body, was put into function. To expedite the process of electrification a provision for establishing Palli Bidyut Samiti was added to the modus operandi of REB. At least 77 Palli Bidyut Samitis were formed soon.

In 1979, during a conversation with BRAC's founder Fazle Hasan Abed, President Zia claimed that he will electrify all the subdistricts (thana) within five years so that BRAC can launch a massive campaign in collaboration with the government to vaccinate all the children of Bangladesh since vaccines required fridges and sufficient electricity to be stored.

Gram Sarkar

Building institutions is central to ensuring good governance at all levels, therefore Ziaur Rahman initiated the Swanirvar Gram Sarkar (Self-reliant Village Government) program to allow the villagers to lead the development programmes such as food production, formation of village-based cooperatives, mass literacy, family planning, and maintenance of law and order, in their respective villages. The key idea was to decentralize the development initiatives in the village areas which were dominated by the local elites who capture the union councils and influence the development works in their favour.

The programme came into being in 1980 and despite some drawbacks created a platform for some of the disadvantaged groups of the villages to be represented. However, there were some nuances in the process and the platform overlapped with the structures of union councils creating antagonism between the two bodies. But the enthusiasm that was created by Zia died with his death in May 1981 and eventually it was abolished by the Ershad government in 1983.

Domestic affairs

Political reconciliation
Ziaur Rahman is both credited and criticized for his reconciliation approach in politics. His advisors and cabinet members came from different backgrounds, unlike the Mujib government. On one hand, war heroes who won gallantry awards for their contribution to the Liberation War of 1971, relatives of the martyrs and organizers of the liberation movement were invited to join the cabinet and on the other hand, he appointed some senior politicians who were against liberation war.

Among the freedom fighters who joined the cabinet of Zia included Akbar Hossain Bir Protik, Abdul Halim Chowdhury, Zafar Imam Bir Bikram, SA Bari, Nurul Huq, Iqbal Hossain Chowdhury and Nurul Islam Shishu. Some organizers of the liberation movement including KM Obaidur Rahman, Professor Muhammad Yusuf Ali and Md. Reazuddin Ahmed joined the cabinet as well. Martyred intellectual Altaf Mahmud’s cousin Sirajul Haque Montu was the textile minister of Zia's cabinet. Taslima Abed, a pioneer women's rights activist who worked for the rehabilitation of rape victims after liberation was the state minister of women's affairs. Language movement activists Jamal Uddin Ahmed and M. Saifur Rahman joined the cabinet as well.

On the other hand, a member of Pakistan's UN delegation of 1971, Shah Azizur Rahman was elected as the Prime Minister of Bangladesh by lawmakers during his presidency. The anti-liberation Peace Committee member Abdur Rahman Biswas and Abdul Aleem, who was awarded life sentence for war crimes in 2013, held ministerial positions in Zia's cabinet.

Ziaur Rahman, to recognize the indigenous population's participation in government, appointed Rajmata Benita Roy as his advisor and later Aung Shwe Prue Chowdhury as the state minister of Food. He also had Sunil Kumar Gupta, a Hindu leader who was an organizer of the liberation movement as his state minister of Petroleum and Mineral Resource.

Economic management
Ziaur Rahman initially relied on Mirza Nurul Huda, one of Bangladesh's most famous economist and an academic with experience of running Finance Ministry of East Pakistan before the liberation war to restructure the economy which was in tatters after the flood and famine. The economic growth was 7.8% in 1977-78 fiscal year. Inflation rate that went up to 62% during the 1974-75 fiscal year, came down sharply but hovered around 12% to 15% during Zia's presidency. Due to the liberalization of trade and manpower export, foreign reserve grew faster during his tenure. Rate of investment (% of GDP) jumped in 1979-80 fiscal year. By then, a seasoned chartered accountant M. Saifur Rahman took the charge of the finance ministry.

Manpower export
One of the major achievements of the Zia government is the manpower export which initially began in 1976 when he was a Deputy CMLA when around 6000 migrants went to the Middle-East. To formalize the process to exporting manpower, the Bureau of Manpower, Employment and Training was established in the same year. By 1980, sizeable amount of migrants started flying under the agreements with different Arab nations and in 1981, private agencies were granted permission to export manpower. More than 60 thousand skilled and semi-skilled labours went to the Middle-East in four years.

Constitutional amendment
One of Zia's most controversial acts was the amendment of the constitution to replace the founding principles of the country and legalise the indemnity act for the killers of Sheikh Mujibur Rahman.

To give the constitution some Islamic colour Zia replaced ‘Secularism’ with ‘Absolute faith in the Almighty Allah’ which helped him to bag some foreign aid and investment from the Arab world. To distance himself from Communist bloc, he replaced 'Socialism' with 'Economic and Social Justice'. Besides, nationalism was defined as Bangladeshi Nationalism, instead of Bengali Nationalism, providing the citizens of Bangladesh with a distinctive identity.

Chattagram Hilltracts Insurgency
The insurgency in the Chattagram hilltracts was inherited by the Zia government. After the liberation war, the political leadership of the hills were trying to inform the new government of Sheikh Mujibur Rahman about their demands and met him at least three times. At one instance, when Manabendra Narayan Larma went to him with some radical demands, a heated conversation ensued between them, and at one point, according to his brother Shantu Larma, Rahman said, "Forget your ethnic identity, become Bengali." He ordered the establishment of three cantonments in Dighinala, Ruma and Alikadam.

This prompted the tribal leadership to found the Parbatya Chattagram Jana Samhati Samiti also knows as PCJSS in 1972. This organization, after the 1973 election, started an armed wing Shanti Bahini to realize their rights through armed struggle against the government. During the liberation war, a portion of the tribal youth populace allied themselves with Pakistan Army and after the war they went into hiding. These youth were the early recruits of the Shanti Bahini. Later, after the death of Sheikh Mujibur Rahman, with Indian support, Shanti Bahini initiated an insurgency in 1977 by attacking the Bangladesh Army convoys.

Ziaur Rahman saw the problem as an economic problem and invited multiple tribal leaders like Benita Roy and Aung Shwe Prue Chowdhury to his advisory council and cabinet to give them representation in the government and formed Tribal Convention to initiate a dialogue with the leadership of PCJSS. However, the leadership of PCJSS favoured armed struggle and refused to engage in dialogues. In response, Zia played his population card and brought in a huge amount of Bengali-speaking people in the hilltracts area who eventually outnumbered the tribal populace, a move that will trigger the insurgency further.

Rohingya repatriation
In 1977 when the Myanmar Army launched the infamous Operation Dragon King to expel the local Muslim Rohingya population, an influx of displaced migrants poured into Bangladesh for shelter. Around 200,000 rohingyas entered into Bangladesh in a span of a year which created a major refugee crisis in Bangladesh. Ziaur Rahman, as the President took this issue to the global level and asked for the UN, OIC and Western bloc's support to solve the problem. OIC, most notably the Saudi Arabia and Libya actively supported Bangladesh in the negotiations with Myanmar government.

At one instance, during a meeting between Ziaur Rahman and General Ne Win, Zia threatened to provide the Rohingyas with arms and training to rohingyas if they refuse to take them back, Myanmar agreed to sign an agreement and took back almost all the rohingyas by 1979 and accepted them as legal residents, something which they were initially denying.

Coups and secret trials
From 1976 to 1981, at least fifteen military coups were organized within the Bangladesh Armed Forces to topple Ziaur Rahman. In March 1976, soldiers killed three senior officers of the army in the port city Chattagram. This was followed by a coup attempt led by Sheikh Mujibur Rahman's killer Syed Faruque Rahman in the Bogura Cantonment in the last week of April 1976, supported by the Air Force Chief MG Tawab. In July 1976, Bogura Cantonment mutinied again. Another uprising took place in Bogura Cantonment in September 1977 and on October 2, 1977, the airmen of signal corps staged a coup and lined up around twenty ranked Air Force officials and killed them.

Zia responded with force. He disbanded one of the most mutinous units, the Bengal Lancers, and put the soldiers on trial. This unit was also involved in the Assassination of Sheikh Mujibur Rahman. However, he allowed their leader Colonel Faruque to leave the country to calm the soldiers in April 1976. He also forced the Air Force chief and patronizer of the Faruque-Rashid duo, MG Tawab to resign and sent him to Germany. To tackle the 1977 coups, which killed senior military and air force officers and almost brought down his government, he sent the 9th Infantry Division to confront them under Mir Shawkat Ali. The mutineers and the government forces met each other at the Dhaka Airport, where the military overpowered the mutineers and shot many of them dead. After the coups, the mutineers were put on secret trial and at least 561 of them were hanged to death after court martial.

Zia, however, honoured the Indemnity Ordinance, 1975 declared by Khondaker Mostaq Ahmad by legalizing it and did not take any action against the coup leaders of 1975 coups, both of August 15 and November 3. But he put the leader of November 7 coup Colonel (retd) Abu Taher on trial and executed him. A Bangladesh court later declared the execution illegal.

Foreign affairs
The Zia government's foreign policy was more inclined to develop strong ties with the west and the middle-east, contrary to the Mujib government that opted for the Soviet bloc. This change in policy was economically more profitable for Bangladesh as the country received a significant amount of aid and credit support which was used to develop factories, roads and research institutes.

United Nations
Bangladesh became a member of the UN Security Council under Zia's leadership in 1979. He addressed the UN General Assembly in 1980 as the President of Bangladesh where he urged oil-producing countries to be more sensitive towards the under-developed countries and offer oil at a lower rate. Bangladesh pushed further in this regard and put forward the Brandt Commission’s findings on the interdependence of North and South and proposed OPEC sell their oil to the developing countries at half of the international rate and invest in the developing countries.

When the Soviet invasion of Afghanistan started in December 1979, Bangladesh was among the first few countries to call for the withdrawal of all foreign troops from Afghanistan and remained active to retain stability in South Asia.

OIC and the Arab world
Bangladesh under Zia made it a priority to strengthen its relationship with the oil-rich Arab nations and the Organisation of Islamic Cooperation. It was considered essential to fund the development projects in Bangladesh and send more migrants to the middle-east who can send the much-needed remittance back to Bangladesh.

Organization of Islamic Cooperation

Bangladesh became a member of the Al-Quds Committee, one of the four standing committees of Organization of Islamic Cooperation under the leadership of Ziaur Rahman, to address the problems of Palestine. He was the member of the Summit committee, and in that capacity Ziaur Rahman attended the fifth session of the Al-Quds Committee in April 1981 and after his consultation with King Hassan II and President Ahmed Sékou Touré, the other two members of the committee, they adopted a resolution with 30 recommendations to solve the Palestine problem and presented them to the United Nations. Zia was also a member of the Islamic Peace Commission at the time of his death in 1981.

After Zia's death, the OIC adopted the Resolution 1/12 OR.G. to condemn the Assassination of Ziaur Rahman. The OIC recalled his "immense contribution to the Islamic Ummah, his untiring efforts till his martyrdom to further the cause of peace and security of the Muslim countries" The resolution mentioned Zia a martyr or Shahid, a respectable person who died for a cause and whose place in Paradise is promised according to the verses in the Quran.

Saudi Arabia

Some of the Arab countries, including Saudi Arabia, did not recognize Bangladesh till the death of Sheikh Mujibur Rahman and had hostile views toward Bangladesh due to the presence of ‘Secularism’ in the constitution and the ban on religion-based politics.

Ziaur Rahman made considerable efforts to break the ice with the Saudis. He replaced ‘Secularism’ in the constitution with ‘Absolute faith in Allah’ and lifted ban on religion-based politics to appease the Saudis and visited Saudi Arabia as a guest of the state in July 1977. In December 1978 the Saudi Minister for Finance and National Economy visited Bangladesh and the visit marked the establishment of a joint commission for promoting bilateral relations and strengthening cooperation. Saudi Arabia committed US$300 million to Bangladesh as grants and interest-free loans and promised to finance the implementation of the second five-year plan from 1980 to 1985 to Zia's minister Abdul Aleem who led a delegate in late 1979.

Saudi Arabia also employed a large amount of skilled and semi-skilled migrants from Bangladesh and in the first three months of 1978, they sent US$1,431,265 as remittance, boosting Bangladesh's economy significantly.

United Arab Emirates

The government led by Zia tried to maintain the relation with the highest level of the United Arab Emirates ruling elites and made a stopover in March 1978 where he reiterated his commitment to the Islamic principles. Export to the UAE, as a result, grew five times with Zia as the Deputy Chief Martial Law Administrator with the charge of Finance Ministry and the export earning almost doubled, from 2,507,000 BDT to 3,834,000 BDT when he became the President in 1978. Bangladesh used to export tea, live animal, handicraft, cables and wires and a wide range of products to the UAE in late 1970s. In 1977, the UAE provided Bangladesh 600,000 tons oil in short-term credit to meet the urgent needs of the country. In the first quarter of 1978, Bangladesh received US$2 million remittance from the Bangladeshi migrants in the UAE.

Iran

One of the most notable global events that Ziaur Rahman's presidency saw was the Iranian Revolution in 1979 that significantly changed the politics in the Arab world. Before the revolution, Bangladesh signed a Memorandum of Understanding with the Iranian government led by Mohammad Reza Pahlavi to send 24,000 workers to Iran. The deal was honoured by the Ayatollah Khomeini administration and Bangladesh stayed neutral during the hostage crisis.

Western bloc
During the era of Cold War, the North American states along with their allies in West Europe and Pacific Ocean, were identified as the Western Bloc. Three of five veto nations were part of this bloc with significant hold in global politics and hence Ziaur Rahman put serious efforts to build a strong ties with the Western Bloc to attain both moral and economic support. Most importantly Zia government prioritized the relationship with United States of America, United Kingdom and France. Zia is the first Bangladeshi President to be invited at both White House and Élysée Palace.

United States of America

Ziaur Rahman is the first Bangladeshi head of state to be invited to the White House by a U.S. president. He visited the White House on 27 August 1980. President Jimmy Carter appreciated Zia's ambition to make Bangladesh a self-sufficient country in food production and thanked him for his statesman-like role in the UN Security Council. Zia used to exchange letters with President Jimmy Carter on development issues. The U.S. commitment for aid support to Bangladesh grew from US$87 million to US$1.5 billion in 1980 after his visit.

The USAID provided the funds and support to convert the Cholera Research Lab into an international research center ICDDR,B. The U.S. government provided constant food aid support throughout the tenure of Ziaur Rahman that helped Bangladesh to feed a large population of 90 million. Besides, the U.S. government was extremely supportive of Zia's move for privatization and the introduction of a pro-market economy and Bangladesh started getting the benefits of the Multi-Fibre Agreement by exporting ready-made garments to the U.S.

Immediately after Zia's death in 1981, President Ronald Reagan expressed his shock and claimed that he was deeply grieved after learning the incident. President Reagan also mentioned that the wisdom of Ziaur Rahman in internal affairs will be sorely missed after his tragic death.

France

Bangladesh was keen to develop an economic relationship with France and some high-level visits took place during the presidency of Ziaur Rahman to France. Bangladesh's Foreign Minister Professor Muhammad Shamsul Huq went to France in May 1978 for a three-day visit which was followed by a two-day visit of the prime Minister Shah Azizur Rahman in 1979. In August 1980, Ziaur Rahman made a stopover in France and was invited to the Élysée Palace by President Valéry Giscard d'Estaing as the first President of Bangladesh to be invited at the presidential palace of France. The two presidents had lunch there and at the end of the day signed two bilateral agreements, one on financial cooperation, the other relating to cooperation in the nuclear field, in particular, to work on the development of a nuclear power plant in Rooppur.

Eastern bloc
Eastern bloc during the Cold War consisted of the now defunct Soviet Union and their allies of the Warsaw Pact namely Czechoslovakia, Romania, Albania, Hungary, Poland and East Germany.

Soviet Union

Bangladesh's relation with the leader of the Eastern Bloc, Soviet Union deteriorated after the Assassination of Sheikh Mujibur Rahman. Though Soviet Union supported Bangladesh during the liberation war and helped Bangladesh to recover from the devastation in the initial days by sending their navy to clean up the mines of Chattagram port area, their support fell short to prevent the famine of 1974 and Bangladesh had to look for support from the U.S. and their allies.

Zia government kept Soviet Union at arm's length and developed close ties with the Western Bloc. The replacing of Socialism with Economic and Social Justice, and introducing Absolute Faith in Allah instead of Secularism as state principle, irked the Soviet leadership. Ziaur Rahman decisively sided the Western Bloc upsetting Soviet Union in 1979 during the Soviet invasion in Afghanistan and demanded for the withdrawal of foreign troops from Afghanistan.

However, cooperation on political and economic front continued. Soviet Deputy Foreign Minister Nikolay Firyubin visited Dhaka in December 1976 and Bangladesh's Information Minister Habibullah Khan visited Moscow in August 1979. In 1981, just before Zia's death, Soviet Union and Bangladesh concluded two agreements on expansion of Ghorashal Thermal Power Plant and establishment of a power station in Siddhirganj.

South Asia
SAARC

One of the pioneering acts of Ziaur Rahman's foreign policy was the initiative to unite the South Asian countries under one umbrella. He shared his vision of a united South Asia free from unfriendly trade barriers and mutual regional security in a letter that was sent to the governments of India, Pakistan, Nepal, Bhutan, Sri Lanka, and Maldives. This eventually culminated into the formation of SAARC in 1985, four years after his death. The first meeting of foreign ministers to form SAARC countries was however held in 1980.

Afghanistan

During the presidency of Ziaur Rahman, Soviet Union sent soldiers in Afghanistan to save the government that was loyal to them. Ziaur Rahman was strictly against this move and personally talked to the U.S. and British government on the possibilities to solve the problem. He met Margaret Thatcher on June 16, 1980, and told that the presence of Soviet troops in Afghanistan is a violation of the fundamental principles of international relations.

Legacy

The policies of Ziaur Rahman as the president of Bangladesh shaped Bangladesh's economy, politics and society. Successive governments and leaders adopted most of his policies and reforms.

After the fourth amendment of the constitution in January 1975, Bangladesh effectively became a one-party state and institutionalized autocracy. All but four newspapers, all controlled by a state-run trust, were allowed to operate and BAKSAL emerged as the only legitimate political party in the country forcing others to go into hiding. These measures weakened the growth of institutions and removed the necessary outlets needed in a democracy to absorb the shocks.  After the assassination of President Sheikh Mujibur Rahman and his senior colleagues, Bangladesh fell into a severe leadership crisis. Pro-right elements who were the supportive of the coup that killed Sheikh Mujibur Rahman were pushing for establishing an Islamic republic, shifting from the secular ideology of the state. Eminent jurist Muhammad Habibur Rahman opined that the events of the first five years of independent Bangladesh, under Sheikh Mujib and successive governments, put the country to the brink of collapse and people become skeptical of the survival of and independent Bangladesh.

His assumption of power took place against this backdrop of famine, conversion of Bangladesh into autocracy and a series of coups that killed hundreds and threw the country into a political and social turmoil. Zia is credited for saving the country from descending into more turmoil and not becoming a failed state.

Ziaur Rahman's reforms and policies have been characterised as pragmatic and effective which helped Bangladesh to recover from the devastation caused by the 1970 cyclone, the liberation war and the famine. He was termed as a moderate leader who wanted to get Bangladesh out of extreme poverty. On the economic front, he transformed the socialist economy into a capitalist one, liberalized trade, and promoted entrepreneurship. These steps eventually were beneficial for the economy as the inflation fell and Bangladesh achieved much needed economic growth. Industries like the ready-made garments and leather got a foothold.

In politics, most of his measures were the acts of balance between different groups who have influence in Bangladesh's politics.

References 

Ziaur Rahman
Presidents of Bangladesh
Presidencies of Bangladesh
History of Bangladesh